Thryptomene podantha is a species of flowering plant in the family Myrtaceae and is endemic to the west of Western Australia. It is a shrub with egg-shaped leaves with the narrower end towards the base, and flowers with pink sepals and petals and ten stamens.

Description
The flowers are arranged in racemes of more or less spherical groups of between two and seven flowers. Flowering occurs from June to September.

Taxonomy
Thryptomene podantha was first formally described in 2014 by Barbara Lynette Rye and Malcolm Eric Trudgen in the journal Nuytsia from specimens collected by Donald Bruce Foreman near Yuna in 1984. The specific epithet (podantha) means "foot-flowered", referring to the pedicillate flowers and fruit.

Distribution and habitat
This thryptomene grows in open shrubland from near Shark Bay to Wandana Nature Reserve near Geraldton in the Carnarvon, Geraldton Sandplains and Yalgoo biogeographic regions of Western Australia.

Conservation status
Thryptomene podantha is classified as "not threatened" by the Government of Western Australia Department of Parks and Wildlife.

References

podantha
Endemic flora of Western Australia
Rosids of Western Australia
Plants described in 2014
Taxa named by Barbara Lynette Rye
Taxa named by Malcolm Eric Trudgen